Uster is a city and municipality in the canton of Zürich in Switzerland.

Uster may also refer to:

Uster Castle, in the city of Uster
Uster Reformed Church, in the city of Uster
Uster (district), a district in the canton of Zürich
Uster Technologies, a company in the city of Uster
Usteria, a plant genus in the family Loganiaceae
Timo Uster (born 1974), a Gambian footballer

See also
User (disambiguation)
Ulster (disambiguation)